TSAC may refer to:

 Tennessee Student Assistance Corporation
 The Springfield Anglican College
 TranSouth Athletic Conference